This is a list of places of worship in the Lower Mainland in British Columbia, Canada.

Christian places of worship
 Christ Church Cathedral (Anglican), Downtown Vancouver, cathedral church of the Anglican Diocese of New Westminster
 Minoru Chapel, a small white wooden chapel that is now housed Minoru Park, Richmond
 St. Andrew's Wesley Church (United), Downtown Vancouver
 St. James Anglican Church, Anglican East Cordova at Gore, Vancouver
 First Lutheran Church, Vancouver
 St Paul's Anglican Church, West End, Vancouver
 First Baptist Church, Downtown Vancouver
 St Mary's Anglican Church, Kerrisdale
 Mt Pleasant Presbyterian Church aka Evangelistic Tabernacle, Mount Pleasant
 St. Francis of Assisi Church, Napier Street, Vancouver
 First Church of Christ, Scientist, Keith Road, North Vancouver
 Church of St. John the Evangelist, Chesterfield Avenue, North Vancouver (Presentation House)
 Saint Paul's Roman Catholic Church, Mosquito Creek Indian Reserve, North Vancouver (National Historic Site of Canada)
 St. Andrew's United Church, St. George's Avenue, North Vancouver
 St Edmund's Church, Mahon Avenue, North Vancouver
 Fountain Chapel, Jackson Avenue, Vancouver
 Unitarian Church, Oak Street, Vancouver
 Vancouver British Columbia Temple, Latter-Day Saints (Mormon)
 Westminster Abbey, Hatzic (Mission)
 All Saints Monastery, Dewdney (Orthodox)
 Milner Chapel, Township of Langley

Sikh temples
 Gurdwara Dasmesh Darbar, Surrey
Gurdwara Sahib Sukh Sagar (Khalsa Diwan Society), New Westminster
Guru Nanak Sikh Gurdwara, 120 Street, Surrey
Gur Sikh Temple, Clearbrook (Abbotsford)
Nanaksar Gurdwara Gursikh Temple, Richmond
 Ross Street Temple (Sikh), Vancouver

Jewish places of worship
 Congregation Beth Israel, Conservative synagogue, Oak Street, Vancouver
 Congregation Schara Tzedeck, Orthodox synagogue, Vancouver

Buddhist places of worship
 International Buddhist Temple, Chinese Buddhist
 Ling Yen Mountain Temple, Chinese Buddhist (temple and monastery)
 Thrangu Monastery, Tibetan Buddhist monastery

Ismaili Muslim Places of worship
 The Ismaili Center Burnaby- Nizari Ismaili Jamatkhana

New Thought
 Centre for Spiritual Living Yaletown, downtown Vancouver 
 Centre for Spiritual Living White Rock 
 Unity Centre, Oak Street

References

https://www.udcdesigns.ca/ling-yen-mountain-temple-richmond-bc/

Religious buildings and structures in British Columbia
Places of worship
Buildings and structures in Greater Vancouver
Vancouver